Strange Weather is a 2016 American drama film written and directed by Katherine Dieckmann. It was screened in the Gala Presentations section at the 2016 Toronto International Film Festival. The film was released theatrically on July 28, 2017.

Plot
Seven years prior to the events of the film, Walker Baylor killed himself at the age of 24. His mother Darcy learns that Mark Wright stole her son's business plan and now operates a chain of Hot Dawg shops in New Orleans, even using a Southern folksy ad about getting a hot dog every Saturday with his mom, which is actually the childhood memory of Darcy and Walker.

Darcy gets her old boyfriend Clayton to give her the gun used by her son to kill himself. She and her friend Byrd embark on a road trip to see Mark. Along the way, they visit friends of Walker to fill in facts of his last day. They go to Darcy's hometown to visit her childhood friend Mary Lou. They visit Walker's father, who is now 70 and in a nursing home.

While drinking, Byrd lets slip she and Walker had sex once. In fact, She was in love with the depressed young man. Byrd says she suffered like Darcy, and tells her she didn't know everything about her son. Darcy continues to New Orleans alone.

Once there, Darcy poses as an interested buyer of a Hot Dawg franchise. She quizzes Mark about how he started the business. Eventually, quoting her son's business plan, she tells him her real name. Then she pulls out Walker's gun as Mark begs for his life. She puts the gun under her own chin but Mark wrestles it free. He asks her how much money she wants, but she only wants to know how her son died, as he was the last to see him alive. He explains what he knows, confesses he was always the lonely rich kid and jealous of the love Walker got from Darcy. He stole Walker's plan to prove his worth to his father.

As Darcy drives home, she throws Walker's gun in a river. She buries in her backyard the clothes he died in, which had been collected by the police in an evidence bag. As she cries, she wishes she could hold his hand just one last time. The next day, on her way to reenroll in college, she goes to find Clayton and embraces him in the street.

Cast
 Holly Hunter as Darcy Baylor
 Carrie Coon as Byrd Ritt
 Kim Coates as Clayton Watson
 Glenne Headly as Mary Lou Healy
 Andrene Ward-Hammond as Geri
 Shane Jacobsen as Mark Wright
 Emily Peachey as Dawg House Receptionist
 Ransom Ashley as Walker Baylor
 Walker Babington as Dennis
 Craig Boe as Buford La Pierre
 Johnny McPhail as Wes
 Michael Randall as Police Officer

Reception

Critical response
On review aggregator website Rotten Tomatoes, the film has an approval rating of 58% based on 24 reviews, with an average rating of 6.05/10.

Susan Wloszczyna of RogerEbert.com described Strange Weather as "a rather dour road-trip movie" and, while admiring "the delicious details that Holly Hunter injects into her performance", concluded that "not even Hunter, who eventually wears out her welcome, can keep Strange Weather from going off the cliff." Ben Kenigsberg wrote in the New York Times that the film is "a case of excellent actors' straining to elevate a contrived screenplay", and one that ultimately delivers "a catharsis more meaningful for [Hunter's] character than for her audience."

References

External links
 
 
 
 

2016 films
2016 independent films
2010s drama road movies
American drama road movies
Films about depression
2010s English-language films
Films directed by Katherine Dieckmann
2010s American films